On November 8, 2022, a general election was held for the Council of the District of Columbia. Elections were held in four ward districts as well as for Chairperson of the council and two at-large seats.

Chairperson
Incumbent Chairperson Phil Mendelson ran for a third full term. He was challenged in the Democratic primary by Erin Palmer.

Democratic primary

Candidates

Declared
 Phil Mendelson, incumbent Chairperson (since 2012) from Eastern Market
 Erin Palmer, ethics lawyer and ANC Commissioner for 4B02 from Takoma

Did not qualify for ballot
 Calvin H. Gurley, accountant and perennial candidate

Endorsements

Results

Republican primary

Candidates
 Giuseppe Niosi, Navy Reservist

Declared
 Nate Derenge, supply chain analyst, councilperson candidate in Ward 8 in 2020

Results

Results

At-large
Elections for two at-large seats are being held in 2022. The first seat may be won by anyone from any party but the second seat is reserved for someone who is not affiliated with majority party. The two incumbents up for reelection are Democrat Anita Bonds and independent Elissa Silverman. Bonds was challenged by three Democrats in the June 21 primary but was renominated with 35% of the vote.

Democratic primary

Candidates

Nominee
 Anita Bonds, incumbent Councilperson (since 2012) from Truxton Circle

Eliminated in primary
 Nate Fleming, Shadow Representative (2013–2015) and staffer for Councilmember Trayon White from Deanwood
 Lisa R. Gore, ANC commissioner for 3/4G-01 from Hawthorne
 Dexter Williams, research analyst for RepresentUs and former staffer for Robert White from Hillcrest

Did not qualify for ballot
 Sharece Crawford, at-large Committeewoman for the DC Democratic Party
 Leniqua’dominique Jenkins, former ANC commissioner for 7C04 and activist
 Ambrose Lane Jr., community activist and co-founder of Black Coalition Against Covid
 Bradley Thomas, attorney and ANC commissioner for 5E05
 Paul Trantham

Declined
 Monika Nemeth, ANC Commissioner for 3F06 (ran in Ward 3)

Endorsements

Results

Republican primary

Nominee 
 Giuseppe Urberto Niosi, contractor

Results

Libertarian primary

Results

Statehood Green primary
No candidates appeared on the Statehood Green primary ballot but David Schwartzman received the party's nomination through write-ins.

Results

General election

Candidates 
 Kenyan McDuffie, Councilmember for Ward 5 (2012–present)
 Frederick Hill, businessman and candidate for Ward 8 in 2020
 Graham McLaughlin, businessman
 Karim D. Marshall, attorney
 Jennifer Muhammad
 Elissa Silverman, incumbent Councilperson (2015–present)

Endorsements

Ward 1

Democratic Primary

Candidates

Declared
 Salah Czapery, former police officer from Adams Morgan
 Sabel Harris, ANC Commissioner for 1B12 (since 2021) from U Street Corridor
 Brianne Nadeau, incumbent Councilperson (since 2015) from Park View

Endorsements

Results

Ward 3

Democratic primary
Incumbent Councilperson Mary Cheh initially signaled that she would run for reelection, but announced on February 11 that she was ending her campaign. At the time of her announcement, Cheh had only two opponents, Brown and Nemeth. Within hours, Cheh's former campaign treasurer, Matt Frumin announced his candidacy. In the following days, several more candidates announced bids for the now-open seat. Ultimately, nine candidates made the primary ballot. Receiving an endorsement from The Washington Post, Eric Goulet became the premier moderate candidate in the race and raised a significant amount of money from outside groups such as the DC Association of Realtors and Democrats for Education Reform. On June 13, spurred by massive outside spending from pro-charter school groups, Tricia Duncan withdrew her campaign and endorsed Matt Frumin. The following day, ANC Commissioner Ben Bergmann and student Henry Cohen withdrew their campaigns in support of Frumin. 

Following these developments, councilmembers George, Allen, and Silverman endorsed Frumin, leading to further consolidation.

Candidates

Declared
 Deirdre Brown, former ANC Commissioner
 Beau Finley, ANC Commissioner for 3C04
 Matt Frumin, former ANC Commissioner and at-large council candidate in 2013
 Eric Goulet, former senior counsel for Councilperson Vincent C. Gray and candidate for this seat in 2006
 Monte Monash, businesswoman and Chair of the DC Public Library Board of Trustees
 Phil Thomas, chair of Ward 3 Democrats, outreach staffer for Mayor Muriel Bowser, and former ANC Commissioner

Withdrawn
 Ben Bergmann, ANC Commissioner for 3D08 (Endorsed Frumin)
 Mary Cheh, incumbent Councilperson (since 2006) (Endorsed Duncan, then Frumin)
 Henry Cohen, student and 2021 Democracy Summer Fellow (Endorsed Frumin)
 Tricia Duncan, Chair of Palisades Community Association (Endorsed Frumin)
 Monika Nemeth, ANC Commissioner for 3F06

Declined
 Matthew Cohen, ANC Commissioner
 Petar Dimtchev, attorney and candidate for Ward 3 in 2018
 Tracy Hadden Loh, member of the Washington Metropolitan Area Transit Authority Board of Directors
 Bill Rice, former DC Department of Transportation spokesman and candidate for this seat in 2006
 Ruth Wattenberg, member of the District of Columbia State Board of Education for Ward 3 (since 2015)

Debates and forums

Endorsements

Results

Republican primary

Candidates

Declared
 David Krucoff, District of Columbia retrocession activist and independent candidate for delegate in 2020

Results

Endorsements

Ward 5
Incumbent Councilperson Kenyan McDuffie announced in October 2021 that he would not be seeking election to the council. Instead, he opted to run to succeed retiring Karl Racine as Attorney General. In early 2022, it was reported that Zachary Parker led his opponents in fundraising, with much of his money coming from notable DC progressives. His closest opponent, Faith Gibson Hubbard, had donors that overlapped with previous donors to the more moderate Mayor Bowser.

Democratic primary

Candidates

Declared
 Gordon Fletcher, Ward 5 Democratic Chair and ANC Commissioner for 5A08
 Kathy Henderson, ANC Commissioner
 Faith Gibson Hubbard, Bowser administration official
 Gary Johnson, education activist
 Art Lloyd, retired deputy U.S. Marshal
 Vincent Orange, At-large Councilperson (2011–2016) and Councilperson for Ward 5 (1999–2007)
 Zachary Parker, Member of the D.C. State Board of Education (since 2019)

Did not qualify for ballot
 Lauren Rogers, ANC Commissioner for 5C02 (since 2019)

Withdrawn
 Harry Thomas Jr., Councilperson for Ward 5 (2007-2012) (Running for Shadow Representative)

Declined
 Kenyan McDuffie, incumbent Councilperson (since 2012)

Debates and forums

Endorsements

Results

Republican primary

Candidate

Declared
 Clarence Lee Jr.

Results

Ward 6

Democratic primary

Candidates

Declared
 Charles Allen, incumbent Councilperson (since 2015)

Endorsements

Results

See also
 2022 Washington, D.C., mayoral election
 2022 District of Columbia Attorney General election

References

External links
Chairperson
 Derenge (R) for Chairperson
 Mendelson (D) for Chairperson
 Palmer (D) for Chairperson

At-large Councilperson
 Bonds (D) for Councilperson
 Crawford (D) for Councilperson
 Fleming (D) for Councilperson
 Gore (D) for Councilperson
 Jenkins (D) for Councilperson
 Lane (D) for Councilperson
 Marshall (I) for Councilperson
 McLaughlin (I) for Councilperson
 Niosi (R) for Councilperson
 Thomas (D) for Councilperson
 Williams (D) for Councilperson

Ward 1 Councilperson
 Czapary (D) for Councilperson
 Harris (D) for Councilperson
 Nadeau (D) for Councilperson

Ward 3 Councilperson
 Bergmann (D) for Councilperson
 Brown (D) for Councilperson
 Cohen (D) for Councilperson
 Duncan (D) for Councilperson
 Finley (D) for Councilperson
 Frumin (D) for Councilperson
 Goulet (D) for Councilperson
 Krucoff (R) for Councilperson
 Monash (D) for Councilperson
 Thomas (D) for Councilperson

Ward 5 Councilperson
 Fletcher (D) for Councilperson
 Henderson (D) for Councilperson
 Hubbard (D) for Councilperson
 Johnson (D) for Councilperson
 Orange (D) for Councilperson
 Parker (D) for Councilperson
 Rogers (D) for Councilperson

Ward 6 Councilperson
 Allen (D) for Councilperson

District of Columbia Council
Council